Dainik Asam is one of the oldest daily Assamese Newspaper running to date. It was first published on 4 August 1965. This newspaper was one of the outcomes of the honest efforts of the late Radha Govinda Baruah. It is published from Guwahati and Dibrugarh.

It also has an internet version. The internet version was unveiled on 1 January 2012. The newspaper is published under The Assam Tribune Publishers.

See also 
 Amar Asom
 Asomiya Khabar
 Asomiya Pratidin
 Dainik Janambhumi

References

External links 
 

Assamese-language newspapers
Newspapers established in 1965
1965 establishments in Assam
Newspapers published in Assam
Mass media in Guwahati